Toulgoetodes boudinoti is a moth in the family Crambidae. It was described by Patrice J.A. Leraut in 1988. It is found on Guadeloupe.

References

Moths described in 1988
Scopariinae